Touria Oulehri  is a Moroccan author. She is a teacher at the École Normale Supérieure in Meknès. She published articles on the subject of literary criticism as well as on both francophone Moroccan authors and authors of the 16th century.

Books 
Aime-moi et je te tue (Virgule editions, 2019)
La Repudiee (2001)
La Chambre (2004)
Les Conspirateurs sont parmi nous (2009)

References 

Moroccan literary critics
Moroccan essayists
Moroccan women writers
1962 births
Moroccan writers in French
Moroccan women essayists
20th-century Moroccan women writers
21st-century Moroccan women writers
20th-century Moroccan writers
21st-century Moroccan writers
Living people